Big League Chew is an American brand of bubble gum that was created by Portland Mavericks left-handed pitcher Rob Nelson and bat boy and future film-maker Todd Field. It was then pitched to the Wrigley Company (longtime owners of the Chicago Cubs) by fellow Maverick and former New York Yankee All-Star Jim Bouton as a healthy imitation of the tobacco-chewing habit common among ballplayers in the 1970s. Over 800 million pouches of Big League Chew have been sold since 1980. Big League Chew was introduced in May 1980, in the traditional pink color already seen in established brands of bubble gum. The cartoon-style packaging, originally designed by artist Bill Mayer, comes in colors such as neon green (sour apple) and bright purple (grape). The original shredded R&D concept samples of the product were produced by running standard sheets of bubble gum through a standard office paper shredder. 

Todd Field, now an actor and director, was not included in the deal with the Wrigley Company, despite being involved in the early prototypes. 

Currently, it is manufactured in the U.S. by Ford Gum & Machine Company in Akron, New York, after taking over distribution rights from Wrigley and moving production from Mexico at the end of 2010.

The original advertising slogan throughout the 1980s, which is still featured today, was, "You're in the big leagues when you're into Big League Chew!" It currently bills itself as "The Hall of Fame Bubble Gum", bearing an official endorsement from the Baseball Hall of Fame.

Notes

External links
 Official site
 Carson Cistulli interviews Rob Nelson, co-inventor of Big League Chew
 Discussion with Nelson about the growth and management of Big League Chew
 Ford Gum information page
 ESPN Los Angeles article about adding images to packaging

Chewing gum
Products introduced in 1980
Wrigley Company brands
Baseball culture